The 2022 American Athletic Conference women's basketball tournament was held March 7–10, 2022, at Dickies Arena in Fort Worth, Texas.  The first three rounds were streamed on ESPN+ with the championship game on ESPNU. UCF won the tournament and received the AAC automatic bid to the 2022 NCAA tournament.

Seeds
With the COVID-19 pandemic in the United States ongoing and the possibility of cancelled games, teams were required to have played a minimum of 75% of the average number of conference games played in order to be seeded by winning percentage for the conference tournament. Teams were seeded by conference record, with tiebreakers used to seed teams with identical conference records. The top five teams received byes to the quarterfinals.

Schedule

Bracket 
* – Denotes overtime period

*Game times: CT

See also 
 2022 American Athletic Conference men's basketball tournament
 American Athletic Conference men's basketball tournament
 American Athletic Conference

References

External links 
 American Athletic Conference tournament Central

Tournament
American Athletic Conference women's basketball tournament
College sports tournaments in Texas
Basketball competitions in Fort Worth, Texas
Women's sports in Texas
American Athletic Conference women's basketball tournament